The Young Montalbano is an Italian television spin-off produced and broadcast by Radiotelevisione Italiana (RAI) in 2012 and 2015. It is a prequel to the Inspector Montalbano series that are based on the detective novels of Andrea Camilleri. The setting is the fictional town of Vigàta, Sicily.

The first series was originally broadcast during February and March 2012 by Rai 1 in Italy. It was broadcast in the United States by MHz WorldView during October and November 2012. The BBC acquired the series in late 2012, and the first episode was broadcast by BBC Four in the UK on 7 September 2013.

In April 2012, it was reported that filming for a second series should start in late 2013. It was delayed until August 2014. The second series was broadcast in Italy during September and October 2015.

Characters
 Commissario Salvo Montalbano – Michele Riondino. Newly appointed police chief of Vigata. 
 Vice commissario Domenico "Mimì" Augello – Alessio Vassallo. Montalbano's deputy and self-proclaimed womaniser.
 Carmine Fazio – Andrea Tidona. Veteran police officer; Montalbano's deputy.
 Agatino Catarella – Fabrizio Pizzuto. Police officer; operates the telephone.
 Giuseppe Fazio – Beniamino Marcone. Carmine's son; joins the department as an investigator and quickly becomes a most trusted assistant.
 Livia Burlando – Sarah Felberbaum. Genoese girl with whom Montalbano has a relationship.
 Gallo – Maurilio Leto. Police officer and investigator, squad car driver.
 Paternò – Alessio Piazza. Police officer and investigator.
 Montalbano's father – Adriano Chiaramida. Widower. They jointly own a vineyard just outside Vigata.
 Nicolò Zito – Carmelo Galati. Journalist and anchor of the local TV news channel Rete Libera. Montalbano is aware that having the press on his side will be beneficial to his investigating.
 Dr. Pasquano – Giuseppe Santostefano. Forensic medical examiner.
 Adelina Cirrinciò – Alessandra Costanzo. Montalbano's cook and housekeeper.
 Alabiso – Massimo De Rossi. Montalbano's superior officer; head of the provincial police force.

Critical reception 
Emily Jupp, in The Independent on Sunday, wrote, "There are a few nods to TV detectives past. Questioning a policeman in Vigata, he turned to go, then in a perfect pastiche of Columbo, asked, 'and one more thing...' This being Italy, the question isn't about a clue, but about food, and soon his yearning for linguine alla vongole has been sated." She concluded by writing, "The niche appeal and subtitles might be a bit of a barrier, but by the end of the two-hour episode, I'd really warmed to this compelling Italian. Riondino's Montalbano could give Cumberbatch's Sherlock a run for his money."

Keith Watson, in the Metro, wrote, "Just as Shaun Evans makes for a physically unlikely but entirely credible young Inspector Morse, so Riondino gives the part of Montalbano an entirely convincing and individual interpretation. […] Even mundane procedural exchanges between cops in the station took on a kind of poetic lilt, weaving a hypnotic brand of Mediterranean magic. […] The feeling was the one you get when curled up with a book on holiday while the sun sets and you're on your second cocktail. Unfolding at a leisurely two hours, with no sense of urgency and no ad breaks, The Young Montalbano had plenty of time to slip local colour into the pair of murder stories that unfolded in laconic ... fashion. It was a rare thing: a crime thriller that teased and circled its prey, rarely breaking into a sweat. Fans of subtitled Euro treats, walk this way."

Gabriel Tate, reviewing the first episode in the London edition of Time Out, wrote, "The Young Morse? Well, Endeavour was pretty good. The Young Lund? Crying out to be made. But The Young Montalbano? Neither especially troubled nor notably enigmatic, the Sicilian detective has never been one of television's more intriguing characters, with the appeal of his show limited to the spectacular scenery and guessing which actor would chew through it the most during the course of that week's investigation. As origin stories go, this isn't exactly Batman Begins, although we learn that he did once have a full head of hair". Overall, he found the opener "Dull, dull, dull – for two hours."

On 11 June 2021, The Young Montalbano had a rating of 7.7/10 on the Internet Movie Database (IMDb).

Episodes

Series 1 (2012)

Series 2 (2015)

References

External links
 

2012 Italian television series debuts
Italian crime television series
RAI original programming
Andrea Camilleri
2010s Italian television series
Detective television series